Dovdony Altansükh (born 6 January 1988) is a Mongolian judoka.

He is the bronze medallist of the 2018 Judo World Masters in the -66 kg category.

References

External links
 

1988 births
Living people
Mongolian male judoka
21st-century Mongolian people
20th-century Mongolian people